Born to Kill is a 1996 South Korean action film by Jang Hyun-soo, starring Jung Woo-sung and Shim Eun-ha. This film pioneered the Korean Noir genre and brought it into vogue in the mid-1990s.

Plot 
The life of a professional killer becomes complicated when he falls in love with his neighbor, Soo-ha, a bargirl.

Cast 
 Jung Woo-sung ... Kil
 Shim Eun-ha ... Soo-ha
 Cho Kyung-hwan
 Kim Hak-cheol
 Lee Ki-yeol
 Myung Gye-nam
 Lee Mi-sook
 Lee Jung-hak
 Kim Kwang-il
 Kim Si-a

References

External links 
 
 
 

1996 films
1990s Korean-language films
South Korean action films
South Korean romance films